Ovitz is a surname. Notable people with the surname include:

Michael Ovitz (born 1946), former president of Disney and Creative Artists Agency
Kimberly Ovitz (born 1983), fashion designer and daughter of Michael Ovitz
Ovitz family, a family of 12 Hungarian Jewish dwarf musicians who survived Auschwitz